The Women's Downhill competition of the Grenoble 1968 Olympics was held at Chamrousse on Saturday, 10 February.

The defending world champion was Marielle Goitschel of France, who was also the defending World Cup downhill champion and Austria's Olga Pall led the current season. Christl Haas of Austria was the defending Olympic champion.

Pall won the gold medal, Isabelle Mir of France took the silver, and Haas was the bronze medalist.

About an hour before the race, eighteen-year-old American Karen Budge was testing her wax on the practice course and narrowly avoided a full collision with a member of the Moroccan men's team, Said Housni, who had been warned once before to stay off the hill. She fell, suffered a dislocated shoulder, and did not start.

Results
Saturday, 10 February 1968

References 

Women's downhill
Alp
Oly